Damian Smith may refer to:

 Damian Smith (dancer), former ballet dancer
 Damian Smith (General Hospital), a character from the television series General Hospital
 Damian Smith (rugby union) (born 1969), Australian rugby union player

See also
 Damien Smith (disambiguation)